Itapipoca Esporte Clube, commonly known as Itapipoca, is a Brazilian football club based in Itapipoca, Ceará state. They competed once in the Série C.

History
The club was founded on December 20, 1993. Itapipoca won the Campeonato Cearense Second Level in 2002. They competed in the Série C in 2007, when they were eliminated in the First Stage of the competition.

Achievements

 Campeonato Cearense Second Level:
 Winners (1): 2002, 2013

Stadium
Itapipoca Esporte Clube play their home games at Estádio Municipal Perilo Teixeira, nicknamed Perilão. The stadium has a maximum capacity of 8,000 people.

References

Association football clubs established in 1993
Football clubs in Ceará
1993 establishments in Brazil